Udobny is a rural locality (a settlement) in Pobedenskoye Rural Settlement of Maykopsky District, the Republic of Adygea, Russia. The population was 1443 as of 2018. There are 38 streets.

Geography 
The settlement is located between Maykop and Tulsky, 5 km north of Tulsky (the district's administrative centre) by road. Sovkhozny is the nearest rural locality.

References 

Rural localities in Maykopsky District